Bala Bazyar (also Romanized as Bālā Bāzyār and Bālā Bāzīār; also known as Bāzyār-e Bālā) is a village in Lalehabad Rural District, Lalehabad District, Babol County, Mazandaran Province, Iran. At the 2006 census, its population was 1,021, in 317 families.

References 

Populated places in Babol County